An innings is one of the divisions of a cricket match during which one team takes its turn to bat. Innings also means the period in which an individual player bats (acts as either striker or nonstriker). Innings, in cricket, and rounders, is both singular and plural; this contrasts with baseball and softball in which the singular is "inning".

Origin
The earliest known record of the term concerns a match in August 1730 at Blackheath, Kent between a Kent side and London Cricket Club. The London-based St. James Evening Post reported: "'Twas thought that the Kentish champions would have lost their honours by being beat at one innings if time had permitted".

Usage in cricket
An innings is one of the divisions of a match during which one team takes its turn to bat, and is said to be "in to bat". Innings is the subject of Law 13 in the Laws of Cricket.

 In a first-class match, there are up to four innings with each team due to bat twice (in practice, this is not always the case). In a limited overs match, there are only two innings with each team batting once (though there can be extra, shortened innings in the case of a tie). 
 An innings may end in a number of ways, such as when all but one batsman on the team is gotten out, or in limited overs cricket, when the limited number of overs for that innings have been bowled.

The term is also used with the meaning of "score" for both the team and each individual batsman. For example, it may be said that "he played an innings of 101", meaning that the player scored 101 runs in his innings (while batting during one of the team's innings). Similarly, it may be said that the team had a first innings (score) of 501.

Metaphor
The term can generally be taken as a reference to the time during which someone possesses something and, colloquially, the phrase "a good innings" means a long life.

See also
 Cricket terminology

References

Bibliography

External links
 ICC Cricket Rules and Regulations

Cricket laws and regulations
Cricket terminology
Cricket